Öyvind Axel Christian Fahlström (December 28, 1928 – November 9, 1976) was a Swedish multimedia artist.

Biography
Fahlström was born in Sao Paulo, Brazil, as the only child to Frithjof Fahlström and Karin Fahlström. In July 1939 he was sent to Stockholm to visit some distant relatives and after World War II he started to study and later on to work as a writer, critic and journalist. From 1960 until 1976 he was married to the Swedish pop artist Barbro Östlihn.

Career
In 1953, Fahlström had his first solo exhibition, showing the drawing Opera, a room-sized felt-pen drawing. In 1953, he wrote Hätila ragulpr på fåtskliaben, a manifesto for concrete poetry, published in Swedish the following year and in English translation (by Mary Ellen Solt, in her anthology "Concrete Poetry. A world view") in 1968.

In 1956, Fahlström moved to Paris and lived there for three years before he moved to Front Street studio, New York City. In New York, he worked with different artists and explored his role as an artist further. In 1962 he participated in the New Realists exhibition at the Sidney Janis Gallery, in New York City. His work was included in the 1964 Venice Biennale and he had a solo exhibition at Cordier & Ekstrom Inc., New York. In 1965 he joined the Sidney Janis Gallery. 

In 1966 his work Performance of Kisses Sweeter Than Wine was included in 9 Evenings: Theatre and Engineering, organized by Experiments in Art and Technology at the 26th Street Armory, New York. The same year his painting in oil on photo paper was included in a group exhibition called Erotic Art at the Sidney Janis Gallery. Fahlström had solo exhibitions at the Sidney Janis Gallery in New York City in 1967, 1969, 1973 and 1976. In 1973 he wrote a play called The Black Room, based on the Watergate scandal, and he had a retrospective at Moore College of Art Gallery, in Philadelphia, Pa. During the late 1960s he was among the contributors of a satirical magazine, Puss, in Stockholm.

Fahlström's work is in the collection of the Museum of Modern Art 

Although some critics such as Frances Richard dismissed him as a "throwback to Surrealism or Agitprop at worst" other critics, such as Mary Flanagan have seen his use of games as constituting examples of critical play.

He became a productive and well-known artist who worked in many genres, often dealing with political and social issues. On Swedish television, he made a name for himself after he smoked a pipe that he claimed contained hashish during a national broadcast.

Death
In 1976 he died of cancer at the age of 48.

Selected exhibitions

2006 Eye on Europe, Museum of Modern Art, New York City
2005 Art and Politics, Museum Morsbroich, Leverkusen Germany
2004 Galerie Air de Paris, Paris
2004 Galerie Johann König, Berlin
2003 Museum Het Domein, Sittard, Netherlands
2002 Institut d´art contemporain, Lyon-Villeurbanne, France
2002 Baltic, Centre for Contemporary Art, Gateshead, UK
2001/0  BAWAG Foundation, Vienna
2000 Museu d´Art Contemporani de Barcelona, Barcelona
1999 Gallery 400, University of Illinois, Chicago
1999 Norrköpings Konstmuseum, Norrköping, Sweden
1996 Kölnischer Kunstverein, Cologne
1996 Centro Studi sull´arte Licia e Carlo Ludovico Ragghianti, Lucca, Italy
1996 Galerie Aurel Scheibler, Cologne
1996 Massachusetts Museum of Contemporary Art, North Adams, Massachusetts
1995 Centre Culturel Suédois, Paris
1995 Uppsala Konstmuseum, Uppsala, Sweden
1995 Gesellschaft für Aktuelle Kunst e. V., Bremen, Germany
1994 Thomas Nordanstad Gallery, New York
1993 Feigen Incorporated, Chicago
1992 IVAM/Centre Julio Gonzalez, València, Spain
1991 Galerie Aurel Scheibler, Cologne
1991 Sidney Janis Gallery, New York
1990 Arnold Herstand & Co., New York
1990 Galerie Baudoin Lebon, Paris
1989 Galerie Ahlner, Stockholm
1988 Olle Olsson-huset, Hagalund, Solna, Sweden
1987 Arnold Herstand & Co., New York
1985 Boibrino Gallery, Stockholm, Sweden
1984 Arnold Herstand & Co., New York
1983 Walker Art Center, Minneapolis
1982 Sidney Janis Gallery, New York
1982 The Solomon R. Guggenheim Museum, New York
1981 Stella Polaris Gallery, Los Angeles
1980 Musée national d´art moderne, Centre Georges Pompidou, Paris
1980 Museum Boymans-van Beuningen, Rotterdam, Netherlands
1979 Moderna Museet, Stockholm
1978 Sharon Avery/Redbird, Brooklyn, New York
1977 Galerie Baudoin Lebon, Paris
1976 Sidney Janis Gallery, New York
1976 Galerie Ahlner, Stockholm
1975 Galerie Alexandre Iolas, Paris
1974 Foster Gallery, University of Wisconsin
1974 Galerie Buchholz, Munich
1974 Galleria Multhipla, Mailand
1973 Sidney Janis Gallery, New York
1973 Moore College of Art Gallery, Philadelphia
1971 Sidney Janis Gallery, New York
1969 Sidney Janis Gallery, New York
1969 University of Minnesota, University Gallery, Minneapolis
1969 Middlebury College, Middlebury, Vermont
1969 Edinboro State College, Edinboro, Pennsylvania
1969 University of Georgia, Museum of Art, Athens, Georgia
1969 University of Texas, Art Museum Austin, Texas
1969 Sacramento State College, Sacramento, California
1969 Galerie Rudolf Zwirner, Cologne
1967 Sidney Janis Gallery, New York
1966 XXXIII Biennale di Venezia, Venice
1964 Cordier & Ekstrom, Inc., New York
1962 Galerie Danila Cordier, Paris
1959 Galerie Danila Cordier, Paris
1959 Galerie Blanche, Stockholm
1955 Galeria Aesthetica, Stockholm
1954 Eskilstuna Konstmuseum, Eskilstuna, Sweden
1953 Galleria Numero, Florence

References

Dr. Livingstone, I Presume av Öyvind Fahlström 1961

External links
Fahlstrom web-site
Fahlström at Aurel Scheibler
Fahlström on Artnet

1928 births
1976 deaths
Swedish artists
Swedish contemporary artists
Experiments in Art and Technology collaborating artists